Derendingen may refer to the following places:

Derendingen, Switzerland, in the Canton of Solothurn
Derendingen, Germany, a part of Tübingen, Baden-Württemberg